San Diego United is an American women's soccer team, founded in 2007. The team is a member of the Women's Premier Soccer League, the third tier of women's soccer in the United States and Canada. The team plays in the South Division of the Pacific Conference.

The team plays its home games at Torero Stadium in San Diego, California. The club's colors are white, scarlet, black and gold.

The team is a sister organization of the men's San Diego United team, which plays in the National Premier Soccer League.

Players

Current roster

Year-by-year

Honors

Competition history

Coaches
  Elio Bello 2008–present

Stadia
 Torero Stadium; San Diego, California 2009–present

Average attendance

External links
 Official Site
 WPSL San Diego United page

Women's Premier Soccer League teams
Women's soccer clubs in California
United
2007 establishments in California
Association football clubs established in 2007